A. H. M. Moniruzzaman is a career diplomat in the Bangladesh Foreign Service. He served as the head of Bangladesh's mission to the European Commission in Brussels and ambassador to Belgium and Luxembourg from September 2006 until December 2008. He was concurrently ambassador to Switzerland.

Biography
Moniruzzaman writes on international relations and political science. He worked on the editorial board of the Millennium, a journal on international affairs published by the London School of Economics and Political Science, during 1973 – 1975.

Education and training
Moniruzzaman attended high school in India.  Then he obtained a B.A. with a First Class from the University of Punjab in 1972. He studied economics at the London School of Economics and Political Science and obtained B.Sc. in 1975. He secured  M.Sc. in international relations from University College London in 1976. After joining Bangladesh Foreign Service, he attended the Graduate Institute of International Studies in the University of Geneva where he received a Certificate in Diplomatic Studies in 1989. In 1986 he attended a professional course on international law at The Hague Academy of International Law under the UN/UNITAR International Law Fellowship. He also participated in the UN/UNITAR course on international economics for diplomats at the Economic Development Institute of the World Bank, Washington, in 1987.

Career
After returning to Bangladesh, Moniruzzaman joined the University of Dhaka in 1977 as an assistant professor in the Department of International Relations. He served there until February 1979 . In 1979 he was appointed as a section officer in the Ministry of Foreign Affairs. Subsequently, he was encadred in the Bangladesh Civil Service in the Foreign Affairs cadre when it was constituted in 1981. In course of his diplomatic career, Moniruzzaman worked in Bangladesh Deputy High Commission in Calcutta, Permanent Mission of Bangladesh to the United Nations in New York, and Embassies of Bangladesh in Kuwait and Paris. Before coming to Brussels, he was serving as the secretary (Multilateral Economic Affairs) in the Ministry of Foreign Affairs in Dhaka. . Moniruzzaman also headed the Economic Affairs Department of the General Secretariat of the Organisation of the Islamic Conference (OIC) in Jeddah from  2000 to 2005.

Special diplomatic assignments
Moniruzzaman served as a delegation of Bangladesh in the UN Committee for Program and Coordination during 1985–89. He also attended numerous multilateral meetings held at the UN Headquarters in New York representing Bangladesh during 1984–87. He was in the group of experts on financial and administrative matters of the finance and Administrative Commission of the UNESCO Executive Board during the group's mandate period of 1996–97 and 1998–99. He led the Bangladesh delegation to the 23rd session of the Islamic Commission for Economic, Cultural and Social Affairs held in Jeddah in 2000. Also, he was a member of the Bangladesh delegation to the Third Extraordinary Summit of the OIC held in Makkah in 2005. Moreover, he served as a member of the Bangladesh Delegation to SAARC and BIMSTEC meetings on several occasions.

Publications

References

Living people
University of the Punjab alumni
Alumni of University College London
Alumni of the London School of Economics
Academic staff of the University of Dhaka
Graduate Institute of International and Development Studies alumni
The Hague Academy of International Law people
Ambassadors of Bangladesh to Belgium
Ambassadors of Bangladesh to Luxembourg
Ambassadors of Bangladesh to Switzerland
Date of birth missing (living people)
Place of birth missing (living people)
Year of birth missing (living people)